Americanism, also referred to as American patriotism, is a set of nationalist values which aim to create a collective American identity for the United States that can be defined as "an articulation of the nation's rightful place in the world, a set of traditions, a political language, and a cultural style imbued with political meaning". According to the American Legion, a U.S. veterans' organization, Americanism is an ideology, or a belief in devotion, loyalty, or allegiance to the United States of America, or respect for its flag, its traditions, its customs, its culture, its symbols, its institutions, or its form of government. In the words of Theodore Roosevelt, "Americanism is a question of spirit, conviction, and purpose, not of creed or birthplace."

Americanism has two different meanings: the defining characteristics of the United States, or loyalty to the United States and defense of American political ideals. These ideals include but are not limited to independence, equality before the law, freedom of speech, capitalism, and progress.

Ideology

According to Wendy L. Wall in her 2008 book Inventing the "American Way": The Politics of Consensus from the New Deal to the Civil Rights Movement, Americanism was presented by a national propaganda campaign to contrast with Communism, Sinophobia, and Fascism, during the Cold War, with the benefits of Americanism being promoted through the ideals of freedom and democracy.

Professor of political science at Clemson University C. Bradley Thompson stated that, 

Some organizations have embraced Americanism but have taken its ideals further. For example, the Ku Klux Klan believes that Americanism includes aspects of race (purity of white American) and of American Protestantism.

In a 1916 essay devoted to Americanism, Agnes Repplier emphasized that, "Of all the countries in the world, we and we only have any need to create artificially the patriotism which is the birthright of other nations."

History

The concept of Americanism has been in use since the first European settlers moved to North America inspired by a vision of a shining "City upon a Hill". John Adams wrote that the new settlements in America were "the opening of a grand scene and design in Providence for the illumination of the ignorant, and the emancipation of the slavish part of mankind all over the earth".
 
During the antebellum period, throughout the 1830s, 1840s, and 1850s, Americanism acquired a restrictive political meaning due to nativist moral panics after increased Irish and German immigration led to the growth of American Catholicism. 

Journalist Matthew Continetti describes U.S. presidents Warren G. Harding and Calvin Coolidge as “spokesmen for Americanism” based on their policies. The John Birch Society and its founder, Robert Welch, promoted Americanism as “the philosophical antithesis of communism.” 

The years from the end of the Civil War to the end of World War II brought new meaning to the term "Americanism" to millions of immigrants coming from Europe and Asia. Those were times of great economic growth and industrialization, and thus brought forth the American scene consisting of "industrial democracy" and the thinking that the people are the government in America. Since then, the success of the American nation  has brought tremendous power to the notion of Americanism.

Ideas

Government

Americanism stresses a collective political identity based on the principles outlined in the Constitution of the United States by the Founding Fathers. Such ideologies include republicanism, freedom, liberty, individualism, constitutionalism, human rights, and the rule of law.

Culture

Americanism espouses a collective cultural identity based on the traditional culture of the United States. Common cultural artifacts include the flag of the United States, apple pie, baseball, rock and roll, blue jeans, Coca-Cola, and small towns. Americanism tends to support monoculturalism and cultural assimilation, believing them to be integral to a unified American cultural identity.

Symbols

Americanism attempts to collect a set of common icons to symbolize the American identity. Well known national symbols of the United States include the U.S. flag, the Great Seal, the bald eagle, The Star-Spangled Banner, In God We Trust, and the Pledge of Allegiance.

See also

 American civil religion
 American Creed
 American exceptionalism
 American nationalism
 Anti-Americanism
 Propaganda in the United States

References

Further reading

 Chinard, Gilbert. (1929.) Thomas Jefferson, the Apostle of Americanism. Little, Brown And Company.
 Dorsey, Leroy G. (2007.) We Are All Americans, Pure and Simple: Theodore Roosevelt and the Myth of Americanism. University of Alabama Press. 
 Gelernter, David. (2007.) Americanism: The Fourth Great Western Religion. New York: Doubleday.
 Kazin, Michael; McCartin, Joseph A. (2006.) Americanism: new perspectives on the history of an ideal  Chapel Hill, N.C.: University of North Carolina Press. 
 Rand, Ayn (1946.) Textbook of Americanism, The Vigil. 
 Yerkes, Andrew C. (2005.) Twentieth-century Americanism: Identity and ideology in Depression-era leftist fiction. Routledge. , 
 What is Americanism?, American Journal of Sociology, 20, no. 5 (March 1915): 613-628. 

 
Political ideologies